The 2014 Liga Nusantara Central Java season is the first edition of Liga Nusantara Central Java is a qualifying round of the 2014 Liga Nusantara.

The competition scheduled starts in May 2014.

Teams
This season there are 9 Central Java club participants, divided into 2 group of 4 and 5.

League table
Divided into 2 group of 4 and 5, winner and runner-up of each group qualify for the semi final 2014 Liga Nusantara Central Java.

Group A

Group B

References 

Central Java